Mattias Härenstam (born 1971) is a Swedish artist. Härenstam specializes in sculpture, installation and video art.

Biography
Härenstam graduated from National Academy of Fine Arts in Bergen, Norway and Städelschule in Frankfurt on Main.

Solo exhibitions

2008
Galleri UKS, Oslo.

2009
Skånes Konstförening, Malmö

2011
Akershus Art Centre, Norway
Tidens krav, Oslo.

2012
Tromsø Fine Art Society, Norway
Kunstnerforbundet, Oslo
Galleri 54, Gothenburg

2013
Luleå Konsthall, Sweden
Galleri Rostrum, Malmö, Sweden
Trafo Kunsthall, Norway

2014
Art-Claims-Impulse Contemporary Fine Arts, Berlin
Konstnärshuset, Stockholm
Galleri Norske Grafikere, Oslo
Østfold Art Centre, Fredrikstad, Norway

References

External links

1977 births
Living people
Swedish contemporary artists
Swedish video artists
Bergen Academy of Art and Design alumni
Swedish expatriates in Norway